Ben Anderson (born 3 February 1978), is an Australian former professional rugby league footballer who played in the 1990s, and coached in the 2000s. He played for the Melbourne Storm from 1998-99. He is the son of Chris Anderson.

Early life
Anderson played junior rugby league for Chipping Norton Kangaroos and was educated at De LaSalle Bankstown.

Anderson played under 19s for Canterbury-Bankstown Bulldogs in 1997, before signing a two year contract with Melbourne.

Playing career
He made his NRL in round 4 of the 1998 NRL season, starting from the interchange in Melbourne Storm's first game at Olympic Park, one of four appearances for the season. He spent most of the 1998 season playing with Melbourne's feeder team Norths Devils, before requiring a knee reconstruction.

This was to be his final game for Melbourne as he was released by the club in October 1999.

Anderson coached Moranbah in Mackay and the Tweed Heads Seagulls in the Queensland Cup. While coaching Moranbah, Anderson recommended Ben Barba to the Canterbury-Bankstown Bulldogs who subsequently signed him.

References

1978 births
Living people
Australian rugby league players
Melbourne Storm players
Rugby league five-eighths
Rugby league players from Sydney
Australian rugby league coaches
Tweed Heads Seagulls coaches